Hannah Cotter (born 15 July 2003) is a field hockey player from New Zealand.

Personal life
Hannah Cotter was born in Hastings and grew up in Napier, New Zealand. Her sister, Kailtin, is also a member of the Black Sticks.

Career

Under–21
Cotter made her international debut for New Zealand at Under–21 level. She represented the junior squad at the 2022 Junior Oceania Cup in Canberra, where she won a silver medal.

She has since been named in the 2023 National Junior Squad.

Black Sticks
Following a successful debut with the junior national team, Cotter made her first appearance for the Black Sticks in 2023 during a test match against Spain in Mount Maunganui. She was later added to the national squad and named in the team for season four of the FIH Pro League.

References

External links

2003 births
Living people
New Zealand female field hockey players
Female field hockey forwards
Sportspeople from Hastings, New Zealand